Lossinia lissetskii is a fossil marine organism from Precambrian strata of the White Sea area, in Russia.  L. lissetskii is a member of the extinct phylum Proarticulata.

Etymology
The generic name refers to the Losinoe Bog (Moose Bog), near the locality on the Zimnii Bereg (Winter Coast) of the White Sea in the Arkhangelsk Region, Russia where the fossils are found. The specific name honors the keeper of the Zimnegorskiy Lighthouse, Valery S. Lisetskii.

Occurrence
Fossils of Lossinia lissetskii are known from deposits of the Verkhovka and Yorga formations of the White Sea area, Arkhangelsk Region, Russia.

Description
The small, oblong-shaped fossils range in length from 3.2 to 8.4 millimetres and 1.8 to 4.7 millimetres in width. The body is subdivided into a distinct, semicircular-shaped head-region and an elongated segmented trunk-region. The full head and central axial part of trunk are covered by extensive ornamentation of small tubercles. These tubercles hide the character of segmentation of the body near the axial zone, but most likely are isomers, normally seen in other typical Proarticulata. The distinct head covered by tubercles is typical for small Proarticulata, such as Onega and Archaeaspinus, and is unsegmented. The periphery of the posterior portion of the organism is completely covered by tubercles in Armillifera.

See also
Tamga
List of Ediacaran genera

References

Ediacaran life
Fossil taxa described in 2007
Fossils of Russia
Proarticulata incertae sedis
White Sea fossils